Malå is a locality and the seat of Malå Municipality in Västerbotten County, province of Lapland, Sweden with 2,050 inhabitants in 2010.

Sports
The following sports clubs are located in Malå:

 Malå IF
 Malå IF Volley

See also
Skogssamer

References 

Municipal seats of Västerbotten County
Swedish municipal seats
Populated places in Västerbotten County
Populated places in Malå Municipality
Lapland (Sweden)